The 2005–06 season was Toluca's 88th season in existence and their 53rd consecutive season in the top flight of Mexican football. The club participated in the Apertura and Torneo Clausura tournaments of the Mexican Primera División and in the 2006 CONCACAF Champions' Cup.

Toluca won the Torneo Apertura after defeating Monterrey on the final, but failed to achieve the championship for the Torneo Clausura after being eliminated by San Luis in the semifinals. Internationally, Toluca were runners-up of the CONCACAF Champions' Cup, losing in the final against América.

This season was also Toluca's first season under Argentine Américo Gallego as manager, who achieved to win the Mexican Primera División title in his first season with the club.

Coaching staff

Players

Apertura

Note: Flags indicate national team as has been defined under FIFA eligibility rules. Players may hold more than one non-FIFA nationality.Ordered by squad number.

Clausura

Note: Flags indicate national team as has been defined under FIFA eligibility rules. Players may hold more than one non-FIFA nationality.Ordered by squad number.

Transfers

In

Out

Competitions

Overview

Torneo Apertura

League table

Matches

Playoffs

Quarterfinals

Semifinals

Final

Torneo Clausura

League table

Matches

Playoffs

Quarterfinals

Semifinals

CONCACAF Champions' Cup

Knockout phase

Quarterfinals

Semifinals

Final

Statistics

Appearances and goals

Goalscorers

Own goals

References

Mexican football clubs 2005–06 season
Deportivo Toluca F.C. seasons